Castel Rocchero is a comune (municipality) in the Province of Asti in the Italian region Piedmont, located about  southeast of Turin and about  southeast of Asti.

Castel Rocchero borders the following municipalities: Acqui Terme, Alice Bel Colle, Castel Boglione, Castelletto Molina, Fontanile, and Montabone.

References

External links
 Official website

Cities and towns in Piedmont